Çamyayla,  is a village that is part of Ayancık district in Sinop, Turkey.

Geography 
72 km to Sinop, 13 km to the district of Ayancık.

Population

Economy 
The village economy is based on agriculture and animal husbandry.

External links 

 YerelNET

Villages in Sinop Province